Fliegerstaffel 10 (No. 10Squadron) was  a Swiss Air Force unit consisting of professional military pilots, belonging to the Überwachungsgeschwader. Their home base at the dissolution was the Military Airfield at Buochs, where ist was equipped with Mirage IIIRS . Fliegerstaffel 10 carried as their coat of arms the AMIR badge (AMIR = Aufklärer Mirage  (reconnaissance Mirage)). This badge shows on a white ground a falcon head drawn with black lines, the neck of which is filled with blue color. The beak rises above the round badge, above the head of the falcon is a number 10 in red. Except for the number 10, the badge is identical to the AMIR badge of the Fliegerstaffel 3 and the Fliegerstaffel 4 (they had a number 3 resp. 4 In the badge).

History 

The then Fliegerkompanie 10 called unit was founded in 1935. From 1938 to 1940 Fliegerkompanie 10 used the Fokker CV.
The 27th of August 1938 was the saddest day in the history of the Fliegerkompanie 10. Five Fokker CV aircraft were on their way from Dübendorf to Lugano when in the Muotatal area, in bad weather, only one found its way out again. The other four smashed, and seven crewmembers perished. From 1940 to 1942, C-35 type aircraft were used after which the C-3603 aircraft was used from 1942 to 1952. From 1952 to 1954, the now Fliegerstaffel 10, formed as a "pilots-only" unit, used the D-3801 Morane.
1954 was the change to the jet plane De Havilland Venom DH-112 Mk1 R, this type of aircraft stayed in service until 1967. In 1956 the air reconnaissance formation was founded. The air reconnaissance formation used a DH-100 vampire, six C-3603 and six P-51D Mustangs, all equipped with cameras.
In 1963, the Aufklärerstaffel 10 was formally established, all the previous aircraft were replaced by De Havilland D.H. 112 Mk. 1 R Venom. The aircraft had been optimized for air reconnaissance and remained in service until 1967. From 1968 on, the Fliegerstaffel 10 operated the supersonic reconnaissance aircraft Mirage lllRS AMIR. The home base became the Military Airfield Buochs. In the year 2000 the Aufklärererstaffel 4 was dissolved, respectively, integrated into the Aufklärerstaffel 10. In 2002 the Aufklärererstaffel 3 was dissolved and integrated into the Aufklärerstaffel 10. In the year 2003, the  Aufklärerstaffel / Fliegerstaffel 10 was disbanded on Buoch's military airfield, after the last course of service. On this occasion, the two aircraft R-2110 and R-2116 received a contrasting black and white finish, with the AMIR-Falcon, the black and white color symbolizing the black / white photos made by these reconnaissance machines on their missions. On December 17, 2003, the last landing of the Mirage lllRS R-2118 in Dübendorf by the pilot Markus "Zurigo" Zürcher, the commander of the Fliegerstaffel 10, marked the ending of the Fliegerstaffel 10. The aircraft remained in the Flieger-Flab-Museum in Dübendorf.

Airplanes 
 Fokker CV
 C-36
 C-3603
 Morane D-3801
 de Havilland Vampire
 de Havilland Venom R
 P-51D Mustang
 Dassault Mirage III RS

References

 Hermann Keist FlSt10
Flieger-Flab-Museum
 Christophe Donnet: Hunter fascination. Schück, Adliswil 1995, 
Farbgebung und Kennzeichen der Schweizer Militäraviatik 1914-1950 (Georg Hoch)  

Swiss Air Force
Military units and formations established in 1935
Military units and formations disestablished in 2003